Andreaeobryum is a genus of moss with a single species Andreaeobryum macrosporum, endemic to Alaska and western Canada.  The genus is placed as a separate family, order and class among the mosses.

References

External links 

 Eckel, Patricia M. 2007. Bryophyte Flora of North America:  Andreaeobryaceae

Monotypic moss genera
Flora of Alaska
Flora of Canada
Mosses